Behind the Glass is a 2008 Croatian drama film directed by Zrinko Ogresta. The film premiered at the 2008 Karlovy Vary Film Festival.

Plot 
Successful thirty-something architect Nikola can feel the walls closing in. Already stressed at the office due to a coworker's breach of professional ethics, he goes home to a life with a wife, Maja, and young daughter that offers no respite. Maja can barely contain her pain and anger over her awareness that Nikola is having an affair. Ana, his colleague and mistress of six years, is near a meltdown of her own, as his endless promises to leave Maja continue to ring hollow. Something's got to give — and so it does when Maja drops a bomb on a family gathering and Nikola loses his precarious balance as his life spins out of control. Unable to take actions or even make decisions to reverse the havoc he has wreaked, Nikola finally learns all too well the meaning of the old axiom “he who hesitates is lost” in the midst of unexpectedly tragic consequences.

Cast 

 Leon Lučev as Nikola Jeren
 Jadranka Đokić as Maja Jeren
 Daria Lorenci as Ana
 Anja Šovagović-Despot as Ljerka
 Božidarka Frajt as Maja's mother
 Vanja Drach as Maja's father
 Katarina Ljeljak as Ida
  as Bosko
 Krešimir Mikić as Miha
 Nina Violić as Marta

Awards and nominations

References

External links 

2008 drama films
2008 films
Films set in Zagreb
Croatian drama films